Kabkabou or Kabkabu is a fish and tomato stew traditionally prepared in Tunisia. The dish is well appreciated as it is relatively healthy and easy to prepare. It consists of a sauce in which fish steak is cooked, and capers, olives and lemons are added.
Many species of fish are used, such as grouper, angel shark, tuna or mackerel.
The main ingredients used in the preparation are onion, olive oil, tomato paste, garlic, harissa, salt, pepper, cumin, caper, lemon, pitted black olives, pitted green olives and saffron.

See also

 List of African dishes
 List of lemon dishes and beverages
 List of steak dishes

References

Arab cuisine
Mediterranean cuisine
Tunisian cuisine
Fish dishes
Fish stews
Olive dishes
Lemon dishes
Tomato dishes